Quashquame (alt: "Quawsquawma, Quashquami, Quashquammee, Quash-Qua-Mie, Quash-kaume, Quash-quam-ma", meaning "Jumping Fish") (c. 1764 – c . 1832) was a Sauk chief; he was the principal signer of the 1804 treaty that ceded Sauk land to the United States government. He maintained two large villages of Sauk and Meskwaki in the early 19th century near the modern towns of Nauvoo, Illinois and Montrose, Iowa, and a village or camp in Cooper County, Missouri.

1804 Treaty of St. Louis
Quashquame is best known as the leader of the 1804 delegation to St. Louis that ceded lands in western Illinois and northeast Missouri to the U.S. government under the supervision of William Henry Harrison. This treaty was disputed, as the Sauk argued the delegation was not authorized to sign treaties and the delegates did not understand what they were signing. Black Hawk, a frequent visitor to Quashquame's village, lamented this treaty in his autobiography. The Sauk and Meskwaki delegation had been sent to negotiate the release of a murder suspect and to make amends for the killing, not to conduct land treaties. The treaty was a primary cause of Sauk displeasure with the U.S. government and caused many Sauk, including Black Hawk, to side with the British during the War of 1812.

Fort Madison and the War of 1812
Zebulon Pike noted rumors that Quashquame was leading a large group of 500 Sauk, Meskwaki, and Ioway near the Missouri River west of St. Louis in 1806. This village might have been at Moniteau Creek in the south part of Cooper County, Missouri, where he was later known to have a temporary village. Quashuame was back along the Mississippi by 1809, Quashquame attended several meetings with the U.S. Army at Fort Madison during the turbulent period leading up to the War of 1812. Quashquame and his band of Sauk remained neutral during the war.

In the Spring of 1809 several Sauk, possibly led by Black Hawk, attempted to storm Fort Madison. They were held at bay by threat of cannon fire.  The next day Quashquame and two other Sauk leaders attempted to restore relations with the United States Army, telling the commander, Alpha Kingsley, that the offending parties were acting on their own and had left the region. Kingsley demonstrated the might of the Army, firing a canister of shot from a six-pounder cannon. The Sauk were astonished and "put their hands to their mouths with an exclamation that that shot would have killed half of them."

Quashquamie attempted to placate Gen. William Clark during a meeting in 1810 or 1811 in St. Louis, telling Clark, "My father, I left my home to see my great-grandfather, the president of the United States, but as I cannot proceed to see him, I give you my hand as to himself. I have no father to whom I have paid any attention but yourself. If you hear anything, I hope that you will let me know, and I will do the same. I have been advised several times to raise the tomahawk. Since the last war we have looked upon the Americans as friends, and I shall hold you fast by the hand. The Great Spirit has not put us on the earth to war with the whites. We have never struck a white man. If we go to war it is with the red flesh. Other nations send belts among us, and urge us to war. They say that if we do not, the Americans will encroach upon us, and drive us off our lands." About 1810, Quashquamie maintained a camp or temporary village along Moniteau Creek in the south part of Cooper County, Missouri, perhaps near Rocheport.

Quashquame was left in charge of the non-warrior members of the Sauk during the War of 1812. Black Hawk wrote: 
"... all the children and old men and women belonging to the warriors who had joined the British were left with them to provide for. A council had been called which agreed that Quashquame, the Lance, and other chiefs, with the old men, women and children, and such others as chose to accompany them, should descend the Mississippi to St. Louis, and place themselves under the American chief stationed there. They accordingly went down to St. Louis, were received as the friendly band of our nation, were sent up the Missouri and provided for, while their friends were assisting the British!"

Later Treaties
Quashquame was a Sauk representative on a number of treaties after the war. In 1815 Quashquame was part of a large delegation that signed a treaty confirming a split between the Sauk along the Missouri River with the Sauk that lived along the Rock River at Saukenuk. The Rock River group of Sauk was commonly known as the British Band, which formed the core of Indians participating in the Black Hawk War. Among other treaties, in 1825 Quashquame signed the First Treaty of Prairie du Chien, which established boundaries between rival tribes.

Villages
Quashquame maintained a village near what is now Nauvoo, Illinois until it was combined with an older village on the west side of the Mississippi near Montrose, Iowa. While living at the eastern village, Quashquame helped mediate retribution for the murder of a Sauk by a white trader near Bear Creek in 1818. About 1824 Captain James White purchased the eastern village from Quashquame. White gave Quashquame "a little sku-ti-apo [liquor] and two thousand bushels of corn" for the land. Quashquame's village moved to the west bank of the river, merging with an existing Sauk village near what is now Montrose, Iowa. This western village was also called Cut Nose's Village, Wapello's Village, or the Lowest Sauk Village, and was located at the head of the Des Moines Rapids, a strategic bottleneck in Mississippi trade. Historical accounts suggest the village was occupied from the 1780s until the 1840s. This village was visited by Zebulon Pike in 1805 and in 1829 by Caleb Atwater.

Atwater interview of 1829
Caleb Atwater visited Quashquame in 1829, Atwater's interview provided the most detailed description of Quashquame and his village near Montrose, and revealed that Quashquame was a skilled artist:

Personal

Atwater estimated Quashquame's age to be about 65, which means he may have been born about 1764. Quashquame was the father-in-law of famed Meskwaki chief Taimah (Tama). Because of his role in the disputed 1804 treaty, Quashquame was reduced from a principal leader of the Sauk to a minor chief. "Quasquawma, was chief of this tribe once, but being cheated out of the mineral country, as the Indians allege, he was denigrated from his rank and his son-in-law Tiama elected in his stead."

Fulton provided this epitaph: "Qashquame died opposite Clarksville, Missouri, about the beginning of 1830. In person he was short, but heavily formed. He was not considered great intellectually, and was regarded as deficient in the traits of a noble warrior. His influence among his people was limited, and his character not free from tarnish. Black Hawk did not hesitate to censure him in the most bitter terms for the part he took in the treaty of 1804." The 1830 date of death is not supported by historical accounts of Quashquame attending a conference at Fort Armstrong in the fall of 1831. An alternative account from the 1870s is that he died and was buried near Davenport, Iowa.

References

Atwater, Caleb (1831) Remarks Made of A Tour to Prairie du Chien: Thence to Washington City, in 1829. Isaac N. Whiting, Columbus.
Black Hawk (1882) Autobiography of Ma-Ka-Tai-Me-She-Kia-Kiak or Black Hawk. Edited by J. B. Patterson. Continental Printing, St. Louis. Originally published 1833.

Fulton, A. R. (1882) Red Men of Iowa Des Moines: Mills & Co.
Johnson, W. F. (1919) History of Cooper County, Missouri. Historical Publishing Co. Topeka.
Pike, Zebulon M. (1966) The Journals of Zebulon M. Pike. Vol. 1. Edited by D. Jackson. University of Oklahoma Press, Norman.
Van der Zee, Jacob (1913) Old Fort Madison: Some Source Materials, Iowa Journal of History and Politics Vol. 11.

1760s births
1830s deaths
Native American history of Iowa
Native American leaders
Native American people of the Indian Wars
18th-century Native Americans